Janik or  Janík may refer to:
 Janik (surname)
Janik (archbishop of Gniezno), 11th century Archbishop of Gniezno
Janik, Poland, village
Janík,  village in Slovakia